Samuel Joseph Tamburo Jr. (July 1, 1926 – December 18, 1998) was an American football defensive end who played one season with the New York Bulldogs of the National Football League (NFL). He was drafted by the Bulldogs in the sixth round of the 1949 NFL Draft. He played college football at Pennsylvania State University.

References

External links
Just Sports Stats

1926 births
1998 deaths
Players of American football from Pennsylvania
American football defensive ends
Penn State Nittany Lions football players
New York Bulldogs players
People from New Kensington, Pennsylvania